Millions Like Us was an English pop rock band signed to Virgin Records.

Millions Like Us released one album, ...millions like us., in 1987, which reached No. 171 on the Billboard 200 in the United States. A single from the album, "Guaranteed for Life", reached No. 28 on the U.S. Adult Contemporary Chart and No. 69 on the Billboard Hot 100.

Members
John O'Kane - vocals
Jeep Hook - guitar, keyboards

References

English pop music groups
English rock music groups
Virgin Records artists